is a Japanese voice actress from Tokyo.

Career
Tanaka was born in Tokyo. She used to belong to the Arts Vision, Office Mori and Pro-Fit talent agency. She is currently free. She is a native of Japan Narration Acting Institute. She has a good relationship with Harumi Sakurai in the trade.

Filmography

Anime
_Summer as Kasumi Suda
3000 Leagues in Search of Mother
Agent Aika as Blue B; White Delmo S
Battle Athletes Victory
Chūka Ichiban
Coji-Coji
DT Eightron
Ga-Rei: Zero as Mei Isayama
Gift as Ibuki Yajima
H2O: Footprints in the Sand as Hinata Kagura
Himitsu no Akko-chan
Kaginado as Yuiko Kurugaya
Kakyūsei 2 as Hiroku Hirasawa
Kodomo no Jikan as Kyōko Hōin
Little Busters! as Yuiko Kurugaya
Lost Universe
Rewrite as Touka Nishikujou
Sakura Diaries
Shuffle! as Tsubomi
School Days as Hikari Kuroda
The Fruit of Grisaia as Yumiko Sakaki

Video games
Aoi Namida
Ayakashibito as Touko Ichinotani
Crescendo as Ayame Sasaki
I/O as Sakuya Kawahara
Iinazuke
Little Busters! as Yuiko Kurugaya
Really? Really!
Rewrite as Touka Nishikujou
Shuffle! on the Stage as Nadeshiko Benibara
Tokyo Babel as Messenger
Tomoyo After: It's a Wonderful Life as Tomoyo Sakagami
Eiyuu Senki as Abe no Seimei, Hercules

As Hikaru Isshiki
2003
Clover Heart's as Hakuto Nagumo
Orange Pocket as Kiriko Kaminuma

2004
Mama Love as Kaori Akizuki
Majipuri -Wonder Cradle- as Sora Kitajima
Forest as Kaoru Mayuzumi
Dear My Friend as Saeka Nagamura
Hitomi -My Stepsister- as Hitomi Maejima

2005
Yume Miru Kusuri as Mizuki Kirimiya
Yunohana as Tsubaki Takao
Tomoyo After: It's a Wonderful Life as Tomoyo
School Days as Hikari Kuroda
Otome wa Boku ni Koishiteru as Hisako Kajiura and Kei Takanashi
_summer as Kasumi Suda and Chizuru Tachibana
Anejiru The Animation as Ryoko Shirakawa
Ayakashibito as Tōko Ichinotani
Ayakashi as Akino Yoake
Yatohime Zankikou as Tou Kusanagi

2006
Really? Really! as Tsubomi
Tsumashibori as Sakura Aoi
Summer Days as Hikari Kuroda
Aruto as Saori Tachibana
Boy Meets Girl as Miu Tsubasa
BOIN ni kakero! as Kei Inamori

2007
AneImo 2 ~Second Stage~ as Saori Shirakawa
[[Sekai de ichiban NG na Koi as Asami Kouno
R.U.R.U.R. as R-Benibana

2008
Sumaga as Arided and Ari Kawashima
Yosuga no Sora as Yahiro Ifukube

2009
Coμ　-Kuroi Ryuu to Yasashii Oukoku- as Kagome Hinaori

2011
Grisaia no Kajitsu as Yumiko Sakaki
Maji de Watashi ni Koi Shinasai! S as Seiso Hazakura

Drama CDs
Hanayome wa Kaihatsu Shitsucho as Sana Takashiro

References

External links
Ryōko Tanaka at GamePlaza-Haruka Voice Acting Database 
Ryōko Tanaka at Hitoshi Doi's Seiyuu Database 

1973 births
Living people
Voice actresses from Tokyo
Japanese voice actresses
Japanese video game actresses
20th-century Japanese actresses
21st-century Japanese actresses
Arts Vision voice actors